Semper's warbler (Leucopeza semperi) is an extremely rare or possibly extinct New World warbler which is endemic to Saint Lucia, part of the Lesser Antilles.

The common name and Latin binomial name commemorate Reverend John E. Semper, an amateur ornithologist who lived in St. Lucia.

Description
The bird is about 14.5 centimetres in length. The plumage of the adults is dark gray at the upperparts and greyish white at the underparts. The immatures are brownish-grey above and have buffish underparts, and the long legs are pale yellow.    The call consists of tuck-tick-tick-tuck noises.

Distribution and habitat
Semper's warbler is endemic to Saint Lucia. It lives in the undisturbed undergrowth of lower montane rainforests and elfin woodlands.

Ecology and behavior
Nothing is known about its ecology but it is probably a ground-nesting bird.

Status
It was rather abundant in the 19th century but there are only a few reports of this species in the 20th century. According to West Indian ornithologist James Bond, it was last collected on the summit of Piton Flores in 1934, another report was from March 1947 where it was sighted between the Piton Lacombe and the Piton Canaries. The last reliable sighting was in 1961. Though unconfirmed sightings were in 1965, 1972, 1989, 1995 and 2003 there is a weak hope for a rediscovery because suitable habitat still remains. A cause for its decline was probably the introduction of mongooses. Due to its possibly ground-nesting habits it was an easy prey for the mongooses. Another cause might be habitat destruction.

References

External links
 BirdLife International (2006) Species factsheet: Leucopeza semperi. Downloaded from http://www.birdlife.org on 25 October 2006

Semper's warbler
Birds of Saint Lucia
Endemic fauna of Saint Lucia
Semper's warbler
Semper's warbler